This table lists the epithelia of different organs of the human body

Human anatomy